The Fort Myers Police Department is the law enforcement agency responsible for primary law enforcement services in the city of Fort Myers, Florida.

In 2015, officers from the agency arrested former professional football player Nate Allen. Allen was later released and cleared of any charges. An investigation uncovered evidence that Chief Doug Baker had discrepancies in his reports and statements. Baker was fired and an interim chief was appointed.

In June 2016, after a six-month national search, the city manager named Derrick Diggs as the next chief of police. Diggs, who is retired from the Toledo (OH) Police Department was unanimously approved by the city council.

Chiefs of police
 1974-1986: Morgan House
 1986-1990: Jere Spurlin
 1990-1991: Harold Ford
 1991-1995: Donna Hansen
 1995-2001: Larry Hart
 2001-2008 Hilton Daniels
 2008-2015: Doug Baker
 2015-2016: Dennis Eads (interim)
 2016–2023: Derrick Diggs

Equipment
The department acquired a MRAP from the U.S. government in 2014. The vehicle, which replaced a surplus V-150, is used by the agency SWAT team.

References

Further reading

External links 
 

Municipal police departments of Florida
Fort Myers, Florida